The Fremont Valley is a valley located in the western Mojave Desert of California.

It stretches from the town of Mojave approximately 70 km northeast to the foothills of the Lava Mountains and Summit Range.

The valley is home to Koehn Dry Lake and the Desert Tortoise Natural Area, as well as the communities of California City and Cantil, California.

The Rand Mountains are at the eastern edge of the Fremont Valley

See also
Category: Valleys of the Mojave Desert

References

California Road and Recreation Atlas, 2005, pp. 94 & 95

Valleys of the Mojave Desert
Valleys of Kern County, California
Valleys of California